Voetbalvereniging Buitenpost is a football club from Buitenpost, Netherlands. VV Buitenpost plays in the 2018–19 Saturday Hoofdklasse.

History
VV Buitenpost was founded on 1 May 1942.

They competed in the 2017–18 KNVB Cup. In the first preliminary round they won 4–3 against ZSV. In the second preliminary round they lost 0–2 against Genemuiden.

References

External links
 Official site

Football clubs in the Netherlands
Association football clubs established in 1942
1942 establishments in the Netherlands
Football clubs in Achtkarspelen